The 2015 Nevada Wolf Pack football team represented the University of Nevada, Reno in the 2015 NCAA Division I FBS football season. The Wolf Pack were led by third–year head coach Brian Polian and played their home games at Mackay Stadium. They were members of the West Division of the Mountain West Conference. They finished the season 7–6 and 4–4 in Mountain West play to finish in a tie for second place in the West Division. They were invited to the inaugural Arizona Bowl where they defeated fellow Mountain West member Colorado State.

Preseason

Mountain West media days
The Mountain West media days were held on July 28–29, 2015, at the Cosmopolitan in Paradise, Nevada.

Media poll
The preseason poll was released on July 28, 2015. The Wolf Pack were predicted to finish in third place in the MW West Division.

Preseason All–Mountain West Team
The Wolf Pack had two players selected to the preseason All–Mountain West Team; one from the defense and one from the specialists.

Defense

Ian Seau – DL

Specialists

Alex Boy – P

Schedule

Personnel

Game summaries

UC Davis

Arizona

at Texas A&M

at Buffalo

UNLV

New Mexico

at Wyoming

Hawaii

at Fresno State

San Jose State

at Utah State

at San Diego State

vs. Colorado State (Arizona Bowl)

The Wolf Pack and Rams are both members of the Mountain West Conference. However, they are in opposite divisions and did not play each other in the regular season in 2015. This is the first time teams from the same conference have met in a non-championship bowl game since the 1979 Orange Bowl.

References

Nevada
Nevada Wolf Pack football seasons
Arizona Bowl champion seasons
Nevada Wolf Pack football